The 1992 Grambling State Tigers football team represented Grambling State University as a member of the Southwestern Athletic Conference (SWAC) during the 1992 NCAA Division I-AA football season. Led by 50th-year head coach Eddie Robinson, the Tigers compiled an overall record of 10–2 and a mark of 6–1 in conference play, and finished second in the SWAC. The Tigers also won a black college football national championship after they defeated  in the Heritage Bowl.

Schedule

References

Grambling State
Grambling State Tigers football seasons
Black college football national champions
Grambling State Tigers football